Mammoth is an unincorporated community and census-designated place (CDP) in Madison County, Montana, United States. It is in the northern part of the county, in the valley of the South Boulder River within the northern end of the Tobacco Root Mountains. Via the South Boulder River, it is part of the Jefferson River watershed, one of the headwaters of the Missouri River.

Mammoth was first listed as a CDP prior to the 2020 census.

Demographics

References 

Census-designated places in Madison County, Montana
Census-designated places in Montana